Criquetot-sur-Ouville is a commune in the Seine-Maritime department in the Normandy region in northern France.

Geography

Population

Places of interest
 The church of St.Martin, dating from the eighteenth century.
 Ruins of a feudal castle.
 An eighteenth-century chateau.

Notable people
 The painter Charles Angrand was born here in 1854.

See also
Communes of the Seine-Maritime department

References

Communes of Seine-Maritime